Joe Hackett may refer to:

 Joe Hackett (politician) (born 1959), former Member of the Pennsylvania House of Representatives
 Joe Hackett (tennis) (born 1925), Irish tennis and rugby union player